Misery Is a Butterfly is the sixth studio album by American alternative rock band Blonde Redhead. The album was released on March 15, 2004 by 4AD. Much of the visual and lyrical imagery of the album is reflective of an accident in which lead singer Kazu Makino was trampled by a horse.

Critical reception

CMJ ranked Misery Is a Butterfly as the 18th best album of 2004.

Track listing

Personnel
Credits are adapted from the album's liner notes.

Blonde Redhead
 Kazu Makino – vocals, clavinet, guitar, programming, string arrangements
 Amedeo Pace – vocals, guitar, baritone guitar, programming, string arrangements
 Simone Pace – drums, percussion, electronics, programming, string arrangements

Additional musicians

 Eyvind Kang – viola, violin, string arrangements
 Jane Scarpantoni – cello
 Skúli Sverrisson – bass

Production

 Greg Calbi – mastering
 Chris Evans – engineering (assistant)
 Juan Garcia – engineering (assistant)
 John Goodmanson – mixing, additional engineering
 Ryan Hadlock – recording, additional production
 Guy Picciotto – production

Design

 Chris Bigg – artwork guidance
 Blonde Redhead – art direction, design
 Jun Koike – initial artwork assistance
 Carlo Mollino – front cover photography
 Keiko Uenishi – initial artwork assistance

Charts

References

External links
 
 

2004 albums
Blonde Redhead albums
Albums produced by Guy Picciotto
Albums recorded at Long View Farm
4AD albums